The Sphinx of Memphis is a stone sphinx located near the remains of Memphis, Egypt. The carving was believed to take place between 1700 and 1400 BCE, which was during the 18th Dynasty. It is unknown which pharaoh is being honored and there are no inscriptions to supply information. The facial features imply that the Sphinx is honoring Hatshepsut, or Amenhotep II, or Amenhotep III.

Discovery
The Alabaster Sphinx was discovered in 1912, when an affiliate from the British School in America spotted a uniquely carved object jutting out of a sand hill. It was so far in the season that excavation was useless, but a year later in 1913 further digging displayed that the object was a Sphinx's tail.

Composition 

The Sphinx of Memphis is also referred to as the Alabaster Sphinx of Memphis, or the Calcite Sphinx. It is the largest calcite statue ever discovered.

The minerals alabaster or calcite in the sphinx's names refer to the yellowish white, soft stone it is carved from; archaeologists and stonemasons have different criteria from mineralogists for distinguishing the very similar minerals calcite and alabaster. Calcite is a simple and common material that has been mined from the earth for centuries. This natural stone was considered beautiful, and in ancient Egypt was believed to have a mystical connection to the Sun.

Physical attributes
With a length of 8 m (26 ft) and a height of 4 m (13 ft), the Sphinx of Memphis is considerably smaller than the more recognized Great Sphinx of Giza. At those dimensions, it is estimated to weigh around 90 tons. It is supported by a foundation that makes it appear to rise out of the sand. Particularly unusual about the Sphinx of Memphis are the striations on its left side, which are uncommon on Egyptian monuments.

Other information 
As years passed from the sphinx's creation, people ravaged Memphite temples and the Sphinx of Memphis is one of the few masterpieces that survived this pillaging. During its time this statue was also displayed near a temple in honor of Ptah. Ptah was one of the Egyptians' world-creator gods.

References 

2nd-millennium BC sculptures
Sculptures of ancient Egypt
Eighteenth Dynasty of Egypt
Alabaster
Sphinxes